Irurtzun is a town and municipality located in the province and autonomous community of Navarre, northern Spain.

References

External links
 IRURTZUN in the Bernardo Estornés Lasa - Auñamendi Encyclopedia, Euskomedia Fundazioa 

Municipalities in Navarre